Sablin is a rural locality (a khutor) in Shchetinsky Selsoviet Rural Settlement, Kursky District, Kursk Oblast, Russia. Population:

Geography 
The khutor is located 98 km from the Russia–Ukraine border, at the north-eastern border of the district center – the town Kursk, at the south-eastern border of the selsoviet center – Shchetinka.

 Streets
There are the following streets in the locality: Moskovskaya and Tsentralnaya (48 houses).

 Climate
Sablin has a warm-summer humid continental climate (Dfb in the Köppen climate classification).

Transport 
Sablin is located 6 km from the federal route  (Kursk – Voronezh –  "Kaspy" Highway; a part of the European route ), 1 km from the road of regional importance  (Kursk – Ponyri), 0.2 km from the nearest railway halt 4 km (railway line Kursk – 146 km).

The rural locality is situated 3 km from Kursk Vostochny Airport, 127 km from Belgorod International Airport and 205 km from Voronezh Peter the Great Airport.

References

Notes

Sources

Rural localities in Kursky District, Kursk Oblast